Erik Martin "Axe" Axenrot (born 5 March 1979 in Linköping, Sweden) is a Swedish death metal drummer, best known as the former drummer for progressive death metal band Opeth from 2006 to 2021. Since 2004, he is the drummer for Bloodbath. Known for his intricate playing style, his drumming has been highly praised by Opeth members and fans, with Mikael Åkerfeldt calling him "a joy to play with." Axenrot has also been jokingly referred to as The Lord of the Rings character Legolas by band members and fans.

On Blabbermouth.com, Mikael Åkerfeldt stated that Axenrot completed his drumming parts for eleven tracks on the Opeth album Watershed in just seven days.

Nathalie Lorichs, who performed vocals on "Coil" on Opeth's Watershed album, is Axenrot's girlfriend.

History
Martin Axenrot's first band, Triumphator, formed in 1995 and made two records ("The Ultimate Sacrifice" EP and full length "Wings of Antichrist"). Martin Axenrot was only involved with Triumphator's demo "The Triumph Of Satan", released in 1996. He left Triumphator after the demo’s release.

In 1999, Axenrot became a member of Witchery and Nifelheim. In 2004, he joined Bloodbath as their new drummer after Dan Swanö who continued in the band as one of the guitarists and songwriters. He met Mikael Åkerfeldt sometime after 15 February 2005, when Peter Tägtgren quit Bloodbath and Åkerfeldt came back into the band again to replace Tägtgren. Axenrot commented on meeting Åkerfeldt, stating "I knew Mikael Åkerfeldt because of the Bloodbath project. I met the other members a couple times because I played festivals with other bands at the same time as Opeth. Sweden is too small to not know every band here. Everybody knows everybody." On 29 August 2005, Martin Lopez of Opeth, had to leave the band again temporarily due to his illnesses. With Opeth searching for a temporary drummer, Patrik Jensen suggested to Åkerfeldt that his bandmate in Witchery, Axe, fill in. Åkerfeldt knew Axe a bit from being bandmates in Bloodbath, but going on Jensen's reference, Åkerfeldt got Axe to play with Opeth for five tours.  On 12 May 2006 Axenrot officially joined Opeth, as Lopez never returned to Opeth after deciding to focus on Soen. In 2010 Axe, together with Opeth bassist Martin Mendez, was performing together with the late Jon Lord and an Orchestra in Nidarosdomen, Trondheim, Norway. 16 November 2021, after 16 years with the band, it was announced that Axenrot had left Opeth due to "conflict of interests" (his Bloodbath bandmate Nick Holmes said in an interview that Axe decided against taking the Covid-19 vaccine); Sami Karppinen has filled in for the North American tour with Mastodon.

Equipment
Axenrot is endorsed by DW Drums, Sabian cymbals, Evans heads and Pro Mark sticks.

References

External links 
 Biography at drummerszone.com
 Interview by drummerszone.com
 Opeth official website

1979 births
Living people
Opeth members
Swedish heavy metal drummers
Witchery members
Bloodbath members
21st-century drummers